Courts of Connecticut include:
;State courts of Connecticut:
Connecticut Supreme Court
Connecticut Appellate Court
Connecticut Superior Court (13 districts)
Connecticut Probate Courts (54 districts)

Federal court located in Connecticut:
United States District Court for the District of Connecticut

References

External links
National Center for State Courts – directory of state court websites.

Courts in the United States